Avron B. Fogelman (born March 1, 1940) is an American businessman and real estate developer. He was a former part owner of the Major League Baseball's Kansas City Royals as well as several Memphis-based sports teams.

Early life
Fogelman was born to Morris and Mollye Fogelman, members of Memphis, Tennessee's Temple Israel. He attended Memphis City public schools and graduated from Central High School in 1958. He received a Bachelor of Arts degree from Tulane University and earned an honorary law degree from the University of Memphis School of Law. While a student at Tulane, Fogelman was a member of the Zeta Beta Tau fraternity.

Later life
He was a former part-owner of the Kansas City Royals from 1983 to 1991. He also owned the Memphis Chicks, a minor league baseball team, as well as the Memphis Rogues, a professional soccer team, and the Memphis Tams, an American Basketball Association team.

He founded the University of Memphis' Fogelman Scholars Program. He helped fund extensive renovations to Tulane Gym, home of the Green Wave basketball team; the gym was renamed Avron B. Fogelman Arena in his honor.

Honors
In 1987, Fogelman received the Distinguished Alumni Award from the University of Memphis.

The southeastern leg of Interstate 240 is named the Avron Fogelman Expressway.

The religious school at Temple Israel in Memphis is named the Wendy and Avron Fogelman Religious School in honor of Fogelman and his wife.

In 2004, Fogelman was named "Tennessean of the Year" by the Tennessee Sports Hall of Fame.

Philanthropy 
In 2019, Fogelman donated his vast sports memorabilia collection, worth more than $10 million, to Florida Atlantic University (FAU). At the time, his gift marked the fifth-largest one-time donation to the university. The collection's 1,200 items are on display in The Avron B. Fogelman Sports Museum at FAU's Schmidt Family Complex for Academic and Athletic Excellence on the Boca Raton campus. 

Highlights of The Avron B. Fogelman Sports Museum collection include:

 The 13 original rules of basketball by James Naismith
 Babe Ruth’s pinstripe uniform pants worn on his first day as a New York Yankee in 1921
 Joe DiMaggio’s 1936 rookie uniform
 Roger Maris’ uniform worn in 1961 when he broke the single season home run record
 Hank Aaron’s uniform worn in 1974 when he broke the career home run record
 1985 Kansas City Royals World Series Trophy
 Final cleats worn by football great Jim Thorpe
 Football signed by the undefeated 1972 Miami Dolphins
 The 1969 Ryder Cup Trophy
 Baseballs signed by sports legends, entertainers, politicians and historical figures

References

Living people
1940 births
People from Memphis, Tennessee
American philanthropists
North American Soccer League (1968–1984) executives
20th-century American businesspeople